"Lonely Won't Leave Me Alone" is a song co-written by Jermaine Jackson, David Foster, Tom Keane, and Kathy Wakefield.  It was recorded by Jackson in 1986, and later by Glenn Medeiros in 1987.

Notable releases

Original version
"Lonely Won't Leave Me Alone" was originally recorded by Jackson. It was the second single released from his eleventh studio album, Precious Moments, and his twenty-third single overall.

Glenn Medeiros version
"Lonely Won't Leave Me Alone" was later recorded by American pop artist Glenn Medeiros. It was the second single released from his self-titled debut album.  It reached number 67 on the Billboard Hot 100 on January 30, 1988.

Adaptation
"Lonely Won't Leave Me Alone" was covered in a Cantonese version as "千億個夜晩" ("A Hundred Billion Nights") and recorded in the album 《千億個夜晚》 by George Lam. (1986)

References

1986 singles
1987 singles
Glenn Medeiros songs
Jermaine Jackson songs
Songs written by David Foster
Songs written by Jermaine Jackson
Songs written by Kathy Wakefield
Songs written by Tom Keane (musician)
1986 songs
Contemporary R&B ballads
Pop ballads
Songs about loneliness
1980s ballads